Siege of Fuenterrabía may refer to:

 Siege of Fuenterrabía (1638)
 Siege of Fuenterrabía (1523–1524)